The white-bellied kingfisher (Corythornis leucogaster) is a species of kingfisher in the subfamily Alcedininae that occurs in parts of equatorial west Africa. The first formal description of the species was by the British zoologist Louis Fraser in 1843 under the binomial name Halcyon leucogaster.

There are three subspecies:
 C. l. bowdleri (Neumann, 1908) – Guinea to Mali and Ghana
 C. l. leucogaster (Fraser, 1843) – Nigeria to north west Angola,  Bioko Island
 C. l. leopoldi (Dubois, AJC, 1905) – east Congo to south Uganda and northwest Zambia

It has ultramarine upperparts and a red bill. The underparts are rufous-chestnut apart from a central white band. The sexes are alike.

References

white-bellied kingfisher
Birds of the African tropical rainforest
Birds of the Gulf of Guinea
white-bellied kingfisher
white-bellied kingfisher
Taxonomy articles created by Polbot